The Den Dolder–Baarn railway is a railway line in the province of Utrecht, Netherlands running from Den Dolder to Baarn, passing through Soest. It is also called the Sticht Line (Dutch: Stichtse lijn). Opened in 1898 in order to link Baarn with the city of Utrecht, it is operated by Nederlandse Spoorwegen and belongs to ProRail.

The railway line is 11 km long and was electrified in 1948. The line is single track, with a passing place at Soest station. The line has 5 stations: Den Dolder, Soest Zuid, Soest, Soestdijk and Baarn. There used to be two more stations on the line: De Paltz (1898-1933) and Baan Buurtstation (1898-1948), the original terminus of this line. After the line was electrified, the line was extended to the other existing Baarn station (which has been the current terminus of this line ever since).

Service
Currently one service operates over the line:

Gallery

Railway lines in the Netherlands
Railway lines opened in 1898
1898 establishments in the Netherlands
Railway lines in Utrecht (province)
Standard gauge railways in the Netherlands
19th-century architecture in the Netherlands